Cuthred is a given name. Notable people with the name include:

Cuthred of Kent, ninth-century monarch
Cuthred of Wessex, eighth-century monarch
Cuthred son of Cwichelm of Wessex, seventh-century prince of the West Saxons

See also
, an Isle of Wight ferry (1969–1990)